In the Republic of India, the various central and state legislatures are presided by either a Speaker or a Chairman. The Speaker is elected in the very first meeting of the Telangana Legislative Assembly after the General elections for a term of 5 years from amongst the members of the Saasana Sabha. The Speaker holds office until either they ceases to be a member of the Saasana Sabha or he himself resigns. The Speaker can be removed from office by a resolution passed in the Saasana Sabha by an effective majority of its members. In the absence of a Speaker, the meeting of Telangana Legislative Assembly is presided over by the Deputy Speaker.

List of Speakers

List of Deputy Speakers

References

Speakers of the Telangana Legislative Assembly
Lists of legislative speakers in India
Telangana-related lists